Robyn Anne Aileen Blackwood (born 22 April 1958) is a former New Zealand professional squash player.

Blackwood was born on 22 April 1958 in Hamilton, New Zealand. She was the women's New Zealand number one and sister of the world ranked Craig Blackwood, and lived in Queensland. She represented New Zealand in the 1981 Women's World Team Squash Championships and 1983 Women's World Team Squash Championships.

She married Bruce Brownlee who was also a leading squash player.

References

External links
 

New Zealand female squash players
1958 births
Living people